Yuan Jiang (Chinese: , p ), formerly known as , was a Chinese painter.

Yuanjiang (p , lit. "") is a city in Hunan on the Yuan River.

Yuan Jiang or Yuanjiang may also refer to:

 Yuanjiang River, another name of the Yuan River (also ), a tributary of the Yangtze in Hunan, China
 Yuanjiang Hani, Yi and Dai Autonomous County in Yuxi, Yunnan, China
 Yuanjiang River, another name of the Yuan River, the Chinese name for the Red River

See also
 Yuan River (disambiguation)